Burdekin is an electoral district in the Legislative Assembly of Queensland in the state of Queensland, Australia. Centred on the Ayr–Home Hill region, the electorate also includes some of Townsville's southern semi-rural localities as well as the coal-mining towns of Collinsville, Moranbah and Clermont. The Burdekin River flows through part of the electorate.

History
The 1949 redistribution abolished the electoral district of Bowen. Part of Bowen was combined with part of Mundingburra (which continued as an electorate, but more centred on Townsville) to create the new electoral district of Burdekin, centred on Ayr and Home Hill.

Members for Burdekin

Election results

References

External links
 Electorate Profile (Antony Green, ABC)

Burdekin
Townsville